Kita-Jūni-Jō Station (北12条駅) is a Sapporo Municipal Subway station in Kita-ku, Sapporo, Hokkaido, Japan. The station number is N05.

Platforms

Surrounding area
 Japan National Route 5, (to Hakodate)
 Kita Ward Tetsunishi Community Development center
 Sapporo Kita-Jūni-Jō Post Office
 Kita-Higashi, Central Police Station
 Hokkaido University, Faculty of Medicine
 Hokkaido University Hospital
 Sapporo Masjid (Mosque). A first mosque in Sapporo and Hokkaido Prefecture.

References

External links

 Sapporo Subway Stations

 

Railway stations in Japan opened in 1971
Railway stations in Sapporo
Sapporo Municipal Subway
Kita-ku, Sapporo